The 2016 Formula Renault 2.0 Northern European Cup was the eleventh Formula Renault 2.0 Northern European Cup season, an open-wheel motor racing series for emerging young racing drivers based in Europe.

Drivers and teams

Race calendar and results

The seven-event provisional calendar for the 2016 season was released on 8 October 2015. The calendar was set to remain unchanged and feature all the circuits that were in the previous season, but a further update replaced the event at Red Bull Ring with a stand-alone event at Hungaroring.

Championship standings
Points system
Points were awarded to the top 20 classified finishers.

Drivers' championship

† — Drivers did not finish the race, but were classified as they completed over 75% of the race distance.

Teams' championship

† — Drivers did not finish the race, but were classified as they completed over 75% of the race distance.

References

External links
 Official website of the Formula Renault 2.0 NEC championship

NEC
Formula Renault 2.0 NEC
Renault NEC